Platycheirus discimanus is a small species of hoverfly. It is found across Europe and the Palearctic and in North America.

Description
External images
For terms, see: Morphology of Diptera. Front tibiae are not dilated. Tarsae 2 first 2 segments are yellow, the first strongly compressed, the second slightly compressed, last 3 segments are black.
Head is large and broad.

See references for determination.

Distribution
Palearctic: South Norway south to Belgium and France and the Alps, Ireland east through Northern Europe and Central Europe into Russia and on through Siberia to the Russian Far East and the Pacific coast at Sakhalin, Afghanistan, Mongolia and China. Nearctic: Central Canada and Pennsylvania Fauna Europaea.

Biology
Habitat: It lives in deciduous forest and scrub; scrub-invaded grassland. Flies April to end May.

References

Diptera of Europe
Diptera of North America
Syrphinae
Insects described in 1871
Taxa named by Hermann Loew